Vina Vidai Vettai is  an Indian Tamil-language quiz show broadcast on Puthuyugam TV that aired every Sunday at 11AM from 10 November 2013 to 9 February 2014  IST for 14 episodes. It was a quiz show designed to test knowledge of Indian culture, sports, politics, history and current affairs. The Show was hosted by actress Kasthuri.

External links
 Puthuyugam TV official website 
 Puthuyugam TV on YouTube
 Vina Vidai Vettai Facebook page

Puthuyugam TV television series
2013 Tamil-language television series debuts
Tamil-language talk shows
Tamil-language quiz shows
Tamil-language television shows
2014 Tamil-language television series endings